Johnson County is a county located in the U.S. state of Georgia. As of the 2020 census, the population was 9,189. The county seat is Wrightsville. Johnson County is part of the Dublin, Georgia, Micropolitan Statistical Area.

History
Johnson county was created by the Georgia legislature December 11, 1858, from parts of Emanuel, Laurens, and Washington counties. Johnson County was named for Georgia governor, senator, and U.S. vice-presidential candidate Herschel Vespasian Johnson.

In 1919, a deputy driving Jim Waters, a black prisoner accused of rape, out of the county was stopped by a group of 150 men at a bridge over the Ohoopee River. The men tied Waters to a tree and shot him numerous times. The case was closed without any investigation.

Geography

The vast majority of Johnson County is located in the Ohoopee River sub-basin of the Altamaha River basin. Tiny portions of the northeastern borders of the county are located in the Upper Ogeechee River sub-basin of the Ogeechee River basin, while the western corner of Johnson County is located in the Lower Oconee River sub-basin of the Altamaha River basin.

Major highways

  U.S. Route 80
  U.S. Route 221
  U.S. Route 319
  State Route 15
  State Route 26
  State Route 31
  State Route 57
  State Route 78
  State Route 86
  State Route 171

Adjacent counties
 Washington County - north
 Jefferson County - northeast
 Emanuel County - east
 Treutlen County - south
 Laurens County - southwest
 Wilkinson County - west

Demographics

2000 census
As of the census of 2000, there were 8,560 people, 3,130 households, and 2,241 families living in the county. There were 3,634 housing units at an average density of 12 per square mile (5/km2). The racial makeup of the county was 62.44% White, 36.96% Black or African American, 0.13% Native American, 0.12% Asian, 0.01% Pacific Islander, 0.07% from other races, and 0.27% from two or more races.  0.91% of the population were Hispanic or Latino of any race.

There were 3,130 households, out of which 32.30% had children under the age of 18 living with them, 49.70% were married couples living together, 18.20% had a female householder with no husband present, and 28.40% were non-families. 26.60% of all households were made up of individuals, and 12.70% had someone living alone who was 65 years of age or older.  The average household size was 2.53 and the average family size was 3.06.

In the county, the population was spread out, with 30.10% under the age of 18, 8.90% from 18 to 24, 24.30% from 25 to 44, 21.10% from 45 to 64, and 15.60% who were 65 years of age or older.  The median age was 35 years. For every 100 females, there were 97.10 males.  For every 100 females age 18 and over, there were 83.50 males.
The median income for a household in the county was $23,848, and the median income for a family was $29,663. Males had a median income of $28,952 versus $18,171 for females. The per capita income for the county was $12,384.  About 20.90% of families and 22.60% of the population were below the poverty line, including 29.60% of those under age 18 and 30.90% of those age 65 or over.

2010 census
As of the 2010 United States Census, there were 9,980 people, 3,347 households, and 2,271 families living in the county. The racial makeup of the county was 63.1% white, 35.0% black or African American, 0.2% Asian, 0.2% American Indian, 0.7% from other races, and 0.8% from two or more races. Those of Hispanic or Latino origin made up 1.9% of the population. In terms of ancestry, 15.8% were American, 8.9% were Irish, and 6.8% were English.

Of the 3,347 households, 32.6% had children under the age of 18 living with them, 44.2% were married couples living together, 18.3% had a female householder with no husband present, 32.1% were non-families, and 29.1% of all households were made up of individuals. The average household size was 2.46 and the average family size was 3.03. The median age was 40.4 years.

The median income for a household in the county was $27,607 and the median income for a family was $35,750. Males had a median income of $31,938 versus $22,410 for females. The per capita income for the county was $15,659. About 21.1% of families and 27.7% of the population were below the poverty line, including 39.1% of those under age 18 and 31.6% of those age 65 or over.

2020 census

As of the 2020 United States census, there were 9,189 people, 3,393 households, and 2,208 families residing in the county.

Government
The county is governed by a five-member board of commissioners. A county manager handles the daily operation of the county.

The county is part of the Dublin Judicial Circuit along with Twiggs County, Treutlen County, and Laurens County.

Education
In 1970, Johnson County schools integrated peacefully due to careful planning by the county's board of education and firm management by superintendent Buren Claxton.

The county's public schools are located in Wrightsville. The school mascot is the Trojan, and the school colors are blue and white. The school fight song is the theme from the movie Hang 'Em High.

Sports
Herschel Walker, a Johnson County native, played on the county's only state championship football team in 1979.
Walker went on to play for the University of Georgia and won the Heisman Trophy. In 2004 Johnson County High School named its football field for Walker.

Communities
 Adrian
 Kite
 Meeks
 Wrightsville (county seat)

See also

 National Register of Historic Places listings in Johnson County, Georgia
List of counties in Georgia

References

External links
 Official Athletics Site
 Johnson County Public Schools

 
Georgia (U.S. state) counties
1858 establishments in Georgia (U.S. state)
Dublin, Georgia micropolitan area
Populated places established in 1858